Chief Tom Ikimi (born 10 April 1944) in Kumba-Southern, British Cameroons (modern-day Cameroon) to John Onile Ikimi and Victoria Isiemoa Ikimi, both from Igueben (Igueben Local Government Area- Edo State). He is married, with three sons and a daughter. He is a Roman Catholic. He was appointed Nigerian Minister of Foreign Affairs in 1995. He has been chairman of ECOWAS council of ministers and ECOWAS committee of Nine on Liberia(C-9) from 26 July 1996.

Early life and education
Tom Ikimi attended St. Joseph's College, Sasse-Buea, Southern Cameroons 1957-1961. He was a pioneer student of the Midwestern Polytechnic, Auchi, Midwestern Nigeria, (now Auchi Polytechnic, Edo State) for his technical education from January 1966 - December 1967 (Building and Civil Engineering) where he obtained Ordinary National Diploma. He was a pioneer member of the Students Union, a keen sportsman and established the College Athletics Club.

His professional education in Architecture was at the Ahmadu Bello University, Architectural School, Zaria from 1968 - 1973, where he obtained the B. Arch (Hons)degree. Ikimi was a member of the student union and National Union of Nigerian Students (NUNS). He moved the motion in late 1970 at the NUNS convention in Zaria to readmit the Eastern Unions back into the NUNS at the end of the civil war.

He was a pioneer member of the National Youth Service Corps Program serving in Ibadan, western [Nigeria] in 1973 - 74.
Architect in the firm of planning partnership later IBRU Vaughan Richards & Partners, Lagos from 1974 - 1977 and was made Associate partner in 1975. Established his own firm, Tom Ikimi Design Company in May 1977 and executed a number of private and commercial projects within and outside Nigeria (1977 - 1993). He later won the international competition for the new OAU office and conference Centre project, Addis Ababa Ethiopia. He is a fellow of the Nigerian Institute of Architects (FNIA) and has business interests in construction, trade and farming.

Positions held
Member Constituent Assembly — 1988/89, 
Member Chapter 2 Committee “Fundamental Objectives and Directives Principles of State Policy”.
National Chairman- National Republican Convention Party — 1990-1992.

He was the Special Adviser To the Head Of State, Commander-In-Chief, General Sani Abacha in February, 1994 where he prepared the memo for the establishment of the highly successful Petroleum Trust Fund (PTF)

He was appointed Foreign Affairs Minister March 1995

Functions at the United Nation
 Led Nigeria's delegation to the Review/Extension Conference of the Parties to the treaty on the Non-Proliferation of Nuclear Weapons (NPT) in New York City and delivered Nigeria's national position address to the conference 18 April 1995.
 Led Nigeria's delegation to the Ministerial meeting of the Coordinating Bureau of the Non-Aligned Movement (NAM) at Bandung, Indonesia, 25–27 April 1995.
 Represented the Head of State, Commander-in-Chief at the 40th Anniversary Meeting of the Movement of Non-Aligned countries, Bandung, Indonesia, 28 April 1995.
 Led Nigeria's delegation to the Ministerial meeting of the Coordinating Bureau of the Non-Aligned Movement at Cartagena, Colombia, 18–20 May 1998 and delivered Nigeria's statement on 19 May 1998.
  Led Nigeria's delegation to the Special UN Security Council Session for Foreign Ministers in New York City and delivered Nigeria’s statement at the session. - 26 September 1995.
 Led Nigeria's delegation to the 50th Commemorative Session of the United Nation General Assembly (UNGA) September - December 1995 and delivered Nigeria's statement to the Assembly on 3 October 1995.
 Nigeria was President of the United Nations Security Council (where he served as the Chairman) in the month of October 1995, when he received Pope John Paul II at the UN 50th Anniversary celebration, in the capacity as President of the Security Council.
 Represented Head of State, Commander-in-Chief at the summit meeting of the Non-Aligned member countries of the United Nations Security Council in New York City - 4 October 1995.
 Led Nigeria's delegation to the 51st Session of the United Nations General Assembly (UNGA) September - December 1996 and delivered Nigeria's statement to the Assembly on 3 October 1996.
 Represented Head of State, Commander-in-Chief at the 11th Summit of the Non-Aligned countries at Cartagena, Colombia, 18–20 October 1998 and delivered Nigeria's statement on 18 October 1998.
 Led Nigeria's delegation to the Special UN Security Council Session for Foreign Ministers in New York and delivered Nigeria's statement at the session. - 26 September 1995.
 Led Nigeria's delegation to the 50th Commemorative Session of the United Nation General Assembly (UNGA) September - December 1995 and delivered Nigeria's statement to the Assembly on 3 October 1995.
 Nigeria was President of the United Nations Security Council (where he served as the Chairman) in the month of October 1995, when he officially received Pope John Paul II at the UN 50th Anniversary celebration, in the capacity as President of the Security Council.
 Led Nigeria's delegation to the 51st Session of the United Nations General Assembly (UNGA) September - December 1996 and delivered Nigeria's statement to the Assembly on 3 October 1996.
 At Bandung, Indonesia, 25–27 April 1995. Represented the Head of State, Commander-in-Chief at the 40th Anniversary Meeting
of the Movement of Non-Aligned countries, Bandung, Indonesia, 28 April 1995.
 Led Nigeria's delegation to the Ministerial meeting of the Coordinating Bureau of the Non-Aligned Movement at Cartagena, Colombia, 18–20 May 1998 and delivered Nigeria's statement on 19 May 1998.
 Represented Head of State, Commander-in-Chief at the summit meeting of the Non-Aligned member countries of the United Nations Security Council in [New York] 4 October 1995.
 Represented Head of State, Commander-in-Chief at the 11th Summit of the Non-Aligned countries at Cartagena, Colombia, 18–20 October 1998 and delivered Nigeria's statement on 18 October 1998.
 Led Nigeria's delegation to the 52nd Session of the United Nations General assembly (UNGA) September - December 1997 and delivered Nigeria's statement to the Assembly on 23 September 1997.

Functions at ECOWAS
 Chairman of ECOWAS council of ministers and ECOWAS committee of Nine on LiberiaC-9) from 26 July 1996.
 Chairman ECOWAS Ministerial Committee of Five on Sierra Leone.
 Led Nigeria's delegation to and chaired the 4th meeting of the ECOWAS Ministerial Committee of four on Sierra Leone (C-4) in New York, 11 July 1997.
 Led the delegation of the ECOWAS Ministerial Committee of Five (C-5) to New York and briefed both the Secretary-General and the Security Council under the Arria Formula, on the situation in Sierra Leone, 11 November 1997.
 Led Nigeria's delegation to and chaired the 8th meeting of the ECOWAS Ministerial Committee of Five on Sierra Leone (C-5) in New York, 5–6 February 1998.
 Led Nigeria's delegation to several ECOWAS ministerial meetings and Head of State summits around the sub-Region.
 Led the ECOWAS ministerial committee of nine (C-9) to successfully resolve the Liberian crisis.
 Supervised under the United Nations, the holding of the first postwar democratic election in Liberia in August 1997 and the establishment of a democratic government headed by Mr Charles G. Taylor.

Roles in Sierra Leone
 The violent overthrow of the government of president Ahmad Tejan Kabbah on 25 May 1997 posed a threat not only to the peace and security of Sierra Leone but also the security and stability of the West African Sub-region. As chairman of the committee of four and five on Sierra Leone, he led negotiations and coordinated the delicate operations leading to the successful restoration of the government of President Ahmad Tejan Kabbah on 10 March 1998.
 Led the ECOWAS Team and was the first to enter Sierra Leone to assess the situation on the ground after the liberation of Freetown from the rebels by ECOMOG Forces 18–19 February 1998 to permit the return of president Ahmad Tejan Kabbah from exile in Conakry.

Roles at Organization of African Unity
His tenure as Foreign Minister coincided with the period when the West African sub-region and indeed much of Africa was beset with conflicts, which including civil wars in Angola, Rwanda/Burundi, Zaire (now Democratic Republic of Congo), the Sudan, Liberia, Somalia and Sierra Leone. The central organ of the OAU was established in Cairo in 1994 as a mechanism for resolving these conflicts. In his tenure, Nigeria retained her membership of the central organ in the three
successive elections which were conducted annually. Aside from the several meetings of the OAU council of ministers, Ikimi represented Nigerian Head of State at the summit meeting of the Central Organ of the OAU Mechanism for the Prevention, Management and Resolution of Conflicts in Tunis, 20 April 1995. He also Led Nigeria’ delegation to the 31st OAU Assembly of Heads of State and Government at Addis Ababa, Ethiopia - 26–28 June 1995, also in Cameroun, 9–10 July 1996 at the 32 OAU Assembly. Zimbabwe, 1–3 June 1997 and Burkina Faso, 8 June 1998.

Politics
 Founding Member and Member of Board of Trustees of All Peoples Party (APP) in 1999-2001
 Accepted the invitation to join the PDP on 22 September 2001. Became Chairman People's Democratic Party (PDP) National Convention Presidential Election Panel in January 2003. Was the PDP candidate at the primary election at Eagle Square that returned President Olusegun Obasanjo.
 Founding Member and National Leader - Advanced Congress of Democrats (ACD) 2005-2006, Inaugurated the party in Edo State on February 21, 2006.
 Founding Member and Member of National Caucus, Action Congress (AC) Party 2006-2010. He Led the Action Congress (AC) to win the Governorship elections in Edo State in 2007 and in 2012 Election.
 Coordinating Chairman- Merger Talks of Major Opposition Parties [ACN], [ANPP], and [CPC]. Parties merged to form All Progressives Congress ([APC]) in July, 2013. Member of Interim Executive Committee (IEC) of All Progressives Congress (APC) Serving as National Vice Chairman South-South Geopolitical Zone July 2013
 Withdrew membership from All Progressives Congress from 27 August 2014.

Honours
Honoured by Pope John Paul II 1993 Knight of St. Gregory The Great KSG. 
Honoured by the Rivers State University of Science and Technology, March 2003 D.Sc (Architecture)
Honoured by the Ooni of Ife- Akinrogun of Ife — 1991 
Inherited family title in homeland- Igueben, Esanland- Edo State- Inneh of Igueben 1988 Title given by the community- Oduma of Igueben — 1993

References

External links
 

1944 births
Living people
Foreign ministers of Nigeria
Action Congress of Nigeria politicians
All Progressives Congress politicians
Nigerian Roman Catholics
People from Edo State
Ahmadu Bello University alumni
20th-century Nigerian architects